Manuel Monsour Tabib del Rosario III (born May 11, 1965) is a Filipino actor, martial artist, producer, and politician. He is popularly known as a Filipino taekwondo champion and actor who starred in several Filipino and international action films. He is the Secretary General of the Philippine Taekwondo Association and a member of the Philippine Olympic National Sports Association Martial Arts Council. He has also served as a city councilor from the 1st district of Makati from 2010 to 2016 and later as congressman representing the same district from 2016 to 2019.

Biography
Del Rosario was born in Manila and grew up in Bacolod, his family's hometown. His mother is Lebanese.

He first learned martial arts under Joe Lopez-Vito, a Moo Duk Kwan system of Tang Soo Do practitioner. After he returned to Manila for his high school education, del Rosario shifted to taekwondo in 1977 as a student of Hong Sung-Chon. Under Master Hong, del Rosario attained a Korean 8th Dan taekwondo black belt. He is a graduate of De La Salle University - Manila.

Del Rosario became a member of the Philippine national taekwondo team from 1982 until 1989, serving as the team's captain in his last four years on the team.

He was ranked first in the Philippines in the Lightweight Division while he was on the team, and was an eight-time National Lightweight champion. From 1982 to 1989, he competed in several international competitions, including the 1988 Seoul Olympics, the Southeast Asian Games, the Asian Games, the World Games, the World Taekwondo Championships and the Asian Taekwondo Championships. He earned a gold medal in the 14th and 15th Southeast Asian Games, a bronze medal in the 10th Asian Games, and reached the quarterfinal round during the 1988 Seoul Olympic Games.

Along with Stephen Fernandez, del Rosario established the Olympians Taekwondo Training Center, a taekwondo school in Taguig.

Acting career
Del Rosario appeared in Filipino action films as early as 1986. Among his more notable starring roles was in Bangis (1995), Buhawi Jack (1998) and Pintado (2000).  He appeared in several international film productions, such as Demonstone (1989), Bloodfist 2 (1990), Techno Warriors (1998) working alongside international martial artist Darren Shahlavi, When Eagles Strike (2003), Bloodfist 2050 (2005) with young martial artist Matt Mullins, and The Hunt for Eagle One (2006). Del Rosario joined Phillip Salvador, Aurora Sevilla and Willie Revillame in Joe Pring 2: Kidlat ng Maynila (1991) produced by Four n Films. He also performed with Lito Lapid, Monica Herrera, and Johnny Delgado in Medal of Valor: Habang Nasasaktan Lalong Tumatapang (1991) also produced by Four n Films. His recent movies were Super Noypi (2005) and Tatlong Baraha (2006).

Political career
Del Rosario first ran for councilor of Makati from the 1st district in 2007 under the ticket of mayoralty candidate and Senator Lito Lapid, but lost. He ran for councilor in 2010 under Nacionalista Party and was successful this time. He was re-elected in 2013 under United Nationalist Alliance, then the ruling party in Makati.

Initially running for re-election in 2016, he instead ran for representative of Makati's 1st district as a substitute to Ichi Yabut, who decided to seek re-election as councilor instead. He was successfully elected to a three-year term. As representative, he principally authored 58 House bills and 47 resolutions and co-authored 118 bills and 9 resolutions in total. The following are the bills enacted into law he authored:
Republic Act No. 11165: Telecommuting Act (as principal author)
Republic Act No. 10931: Universal Access to Quality Tertiary Education Act (as co-author)
Republic Act No. 10928: Philippine Passport Act (as co-author)
Republic Act No. 10969: Free Irrigation Service Act (as co-author)
Republic Act No. 11223: Universal Healthcare Act (as co-author)

Though eligible for re-election as representative, he ran for vice mayor of Makati in 2019 as the running mate of Junjun Binay; however, they both lost. He ran for senator in 2022 under Reporma but lost.

Filmography

Movies
1986 Gabi na Kumander (Viva Films)
1986 Iisa Lang Ang Dapat Mamatay (Imus Productions)
1988 Enteng, The Dragon  (RVQ Productions)
1989 Eagle Squad (Viva Films and Falcon Productions)
1989 Hindi Pahuhuli ng Buhay (Viva Films)
1990 "Bloodfist 2"... Tobo Castanerra 
1990 Legend Of Lost Dragon (Archer Films)
1990 Dadaan Ka Sa Ibabaw ng Aking Bangkay .... Arnold (Red Hosrse Production and Seiko Films)
1990 Subukan Kita Kung Kaya mo! .... Arnold (FLT Films) 
1990 Hanggang Kailan Ka Papatay .... Hector (Regal Films and Moviestars)
1991 Kidlat ng Maynila: Joe Pring 2 .... Nur Adiloka (Four N Films and Moviestars)
1991 Dinampot Ka Lang Sa Putik .... Ambet (Regal Films)
1991 Medal Of Valor: Habang Lalong Nasasaktan Tumatapang .... Cpl. Alvarez (Four N Films)
1991 Ganti ng Api .... Andro (Vision Films)
1991 Contreras Gang .... Tenyente Lazaro (Moviestars Production)
1992 Amang Capulong: Anak ng Tondo II .... Amang Capulong (Four N Films)
1992 Alyas Hunyango .... Victor (Omega Releasing Organization Inc)
1993 Maricris Sioson Story (Regal Films)
1993 Magkasangga 2000 (Harvest Productions) .... Sword Narding
1993 Kakambal Ko Sa Tapang (Bonanza Films) .... Carding
1994 Massacre Files .... Dante (Regal Films)
1994 Chinatown 2: The Vigilantes .... (Four N Films)
1994 Shake, Rattle & Roll V .... Victor  (segment "Maligno")
1995 Romano Sagrado: Talim sa Dilim .... Romano Sagrado (Regal Films)
1995 COSTALES .... Don Joselito Cortez (Regal Films)
1995 Bangis (Regal Films)
1996 OKI DOKI DOC .... Taxi Driver (Star Cinema)
1996 Huling Sagupaan (Regal Films)
1997 Matang Aguila (Regal Films)
1997 Anak Pagsubok Lamang .... Franco Escandor (FLT Films) 
1997 Harangan (MaQ Productions and Regal Films)
1997 Padre Kalibre (Regal Films)
1998 Techno Warriors .... Ken (Filmswell International Limited)
1998 Buhawi Jack (Regal Films)
1998 Codename: Bomba (Regal Films)
1999 Kanang Kamay Ituturo Mo Itutumba ko! (MAQ Productions and Regal Films)
1999 Luksong Tinik .... Ado (Regal Films)
1999 Pintado .... Drigo (Regal Films)
1999 Dugo ng Birhen: El Kapitan (Regal Films and Good Harvest Productions)
1999 Lalaban ako hanggang sa huling hininga (Regal Films)
2003 Operation Balikatan (Premiere Films)
2004 Mano Mano 3: Ang Arnis Laban Sa Kaaway .... Dindo Aragon (Rocketts Films)
2005 Uno .... Mike (Rocketts Films)
2005 Super Noypi ... Diego
2006 Tatlong Baraha .... Faustino (Lapid Films) His Last Film
2016 Master... Philippine Senator
2017 Blood Hunters: Rise of the Hybrids ... First Major Comeback on His Project
2018 The Trigonal .... Mike Vasquez (Viva Films)

Television
1997 O-Gag (ABC 5)
2002 Sa Puso Ko Iingatan Ka .... Mario (ABS-CBN)
2003 Narito Ang Puso Ko .... Ernesto San Vicente (GMA Network)
2003 Basta't Kasama Kita .... Ramir (ABS-CBN)
2005 Maynila (GMA Network)
2006 Panday (ABS-CBN)
2007 Rounin .... Draco (ABS-CBN)
2007 Zaido: Pulis Pangkalawakan .... Izcaruz (GMA Network)
2007-2009 Fit and Fast .... Host (Makisig Network)
2008 Kung Fu Kids'' .... Yuen (ABS-CBN)

Personal life
Del Rosario is married to Joy Zapanta. She suffered a miscarriage to their twins but later gave birth to their son Matthew in 2006.

See also
 Taekwondo in the Philippines

References

External links
 
 Official Monsour del Rosario website; accessed December 9, 2014
 
 Monsour and Van Dam Monsour's 'Kicking' Encounter, October 28, 1998; accessed December 9, 2014.
 Senate President Tito Sotto 111, Former Congressman Monsour del Rosario 111 & Senator Chiz Escudero, Among Honorees During the Philippine Military Academy (PMA) Alumni Celebrations 2020, medium.com, February 23, 2020

|-

1965 births
Living people
Filipino martial artists
Filipino male taekwondo practitioners
Filipino people of Arab descent
Filipino YouTubers
De La Salle University alumni
Sportspeople from Bacolod
Male actors from Negros Occidental
People from Makati
Sportspeople from Metro Manila
Male actors from Metro Manila
Members of the House of Representatives of the Philippines from Makati
Metro Manila city and municipal councilors
Olympic taekwondo practitioners of the Philippines
Filipino sportsperson-politicians
Nacionalista Party politicians
United Nationalist Alliance politicians
PDP–Laban politicians
Asian Games medalists in taekwondo
Taekwondo practitioners at the 1986 Asian Games
Taekwondo practitioners at the 1988 Summer Olympics
Asian Games bronze medalists for the Philippines
Medalists at the 1986 Asian Games
Visayan people
Southeast Asian Games medalists in taekwondo
Southeast Asian Games gold medalists for the Philippines
Competitors at the 1987 Southeast Asian Games
World Taekwondo Championships medalists
Filipino male film actors
Filipino male television actors
ABS-CBN personalities
GMA Network personalities